50-50 club  may refer to:

 50 goals in 50 games (National Hockey League)
 The 50/50 Club, a Cincinnati television talk/variety show hosted by Ruth Lyons during 1953–1967

See also
 40–40 club (Major League Baseball)